The 1930 Oklahoma A&M Cowboys football team represented Oklahoma A&M College in the 1930 college football season. This was the 30th year of football at A&M and the second under Pappy Waldorf. The Cowboys played their home games at Lewis Field in Stillwater, Oklahoma. They finished the season 7–2–1, 2–0 in the Missouri Valley Conference.

Schedule

References

Oklahoma AandM
Oklahoma State Cowboys football seasons
Missouri Valley Conference football champion seasons
Oklahoma AandM